Joseph Trinh Chinh Truc (25 October 1925 – 23 September 2011) was the Catholic bishop of the Diocese of Ban Mê Thuôt, Vietnam. Ordained to the priesthood in 1954, Truc was named bishop in 1981, and retired in 2000.

Notes

1925 births
2011 deaths
20th-century Roman Catholic bishops in Vietnam
Place of birth missing